The Río de los Patos is a river of Argentina.

Climate

The Valle de los Patos Superior has a dry-summer subarctic climate (Koppen: Dsc).
In July 1972, thermometers registered the temperature of -39C, the all-time record low of Argentina.

See also

References

 Rand McNally, The New International Atlas, 1993.
  GEOnet Names Server

Rivers of Argentina
Rivers of San Juan Province, Argentina